Louis-Audet Lapointe (May 16, 1860 – February 7, 1920) was a liquor merchant, wholesaler and political figure in Quebec. He represented St. James in the House of Commons of Canada from 1911 to 1920 as a Liberal.

He was born in Contrecœur, Canada East, the son of Louis Audet-Lapointe and Marguerite-Adéas Dupré, and was educated in Terrebonne, at the Collège de Varennes and at the Montreal Business College. In 1879, he married Léocadie-Azilda Brunet. He served as a member of the city council for Montreal from 1900 to 1916. He was re-elected in 1917 as a Laurier Liberal. Audet-Lapointe died in office at the age of 59.

References

External links
 

Members of the House of Commons of Canada from Quebec
Liberal Party of Canada MPs
1860 births
1920 deaths
People from Montérégie